Andrea D'Antoni (1811 – 1868) was an Italian painter of the Neoclassical period.

He studied under Giuseppe Patania. One of his pupils was Pietro Volpes. Some of his works are displayed in the Galleria d'Arte Moderna di Sant'Anna in Palermo. He painted a Deposition from the Cross (1852) for the church of Santissima Trinità, Petralia Sottana.

References

1811 births
1868 deaths
19th-century Italian painters
Italian male painters
Painters from Palermo
19th-century Italian male artists